Loredana Zefi (born 1 September 1995), also known mononymously as Loredana, is a Swiss-born Kosovan rapper. Her debut single, "", was a commercial success in Albania and German-speaking Europe, and received two gold certifications in Austria and Germany. In September 2018, Loredana signed with German subsidiary of Sony Music and released the commercially successful single "Bonnie & Clyde" with husband Mozzik. Her debut studio album, King Lori, followed in September 2019 and reached the top three in the latter countries and Switzerland. It featured several successful singles, including "", "", "", as well as the rapper's first number-one single in Germany, "".

Loredana released four subsequent number-one single's, "", "", "" and "", in 2020. Her second studio album, Medusa (2020), reached the top 20 in Austria, Germany and Switzerland, respectively. Following a brief hiatus, Loredana and Mozzik released their first collaborative album, No Rich Parents, in 2021, which featured the number-one single "". She has received several awards and nominations, including the Bravo Otto Awards, MTV Europe Music Awards and Swiss Music Awards.

Life and career

1995–2018: Early life and career beginnings 

Loredana was born on 1 September 1995 into a Kosovan family from Ferizaj in the city of Lucerne, Switzerland. Her family is of the Catholic faith. At the age of 18, she became interested in music and wrote songs for other artists along with German producer Macloud. In 2018, Loredana gained widespread attention as an influencer for her short social media videos featuring dancing and lip-syncing content, as well as her relationship with Kosovo-Albanian rapper Mozzik. Her debut single, "", was subsequently released in June 2018. It was commercially successful in Albania and German-speaking Europe, and was certified gold in Austria and Germany. "Bonnie & Clyde" in collaboration with Mozzik was released as her second single in September 2018. The Albanian and German-language hip hop and R&B track was as commercially successful as its predecessor "Sonnenbrille". In the same year, she released her third single "Milliondollar$mile", which saw a moderate success.

2019–present: King Lori and Medusa 

In 2019, Loredana collaborated a second time with her partner Mozzik on "Romeo & Juliet" peaking at number two in Germany. The two follow-up singles "Labyrinth" and "Jetzt rufst du an", all entered the charts in Austria and Germany. The same year, Loredana released her seventh single "Eiskalt" featuring Mozzik, which achieved to be certified gold in Germany and Austria. The single marks the third time that both artists have collaborated musically on a recording. A month later, she released her debut studio album, King Lori, featuring the commercially successful singles "Genick", "Mit dir" and the number-one single "Kein Plan". In November 2019, she emerged as the winner of the Best Swiss Act at the 2019 MTV Europe Music Awards. In 2019, Loredana was the second most Googled personality in Switzerland.

In January 2020, the number one single "Kein Wort" was released in collaboration with German rapper Juju. In March 2020, she embarked on the King Lori Tour, which was later cancelled due to the pandemic of the coronavirus disease 2019-20 (COVID-19) in China and its spread to other countries. The same month, she released her next number one singles "Angst" featuring English producer Rymez, and "Du bist mein" with German rapper Zuna.

Personal life 

Loredana Zefi began a relationship with Kosovo-Albanian rapper Mozzik and married him in 2018. She gave birth to the couple's first daughter Hana on 18 December 2018 in Lucerne, Switzerland. The couple separated in October 2019. They were back together again in March 2021, working on a new music project.

Discography 

King Lori (2019)
Medusa (2020)
No Rich Parents (2021)

Tours 

 2020: King Lori Tour (cancelled due COVID-19 pandemic)
 2021: Loredana Tour (cancelled due COVID-19 pandemic)

Awards and nominations

References 

1995 births
21st-century Swiss musicians
Living people
People from Lucerne
Kosovan rappers
Kosovan emigrants to Switzerland
MTV Europe Music Award winners
Sony Music Publishing artists
People from Ferizaj